Government Dockyard is a dockyard of Hong Kong Government responsible for the design, procurement and maintenance of all vessels owned by the Government.

The dockyard occupies a site of 98 hectares on the northeast coast of Stonecutters Island in Hong Kong and has an 8.3-hectare protected water basin as an operational base for vessels operated by the Marine Department. The dockyard has a shiplift system and three ship-hoists capable of drydocking vessels of up to 750 tonnes. An on-line computerised information system is employed to co-ordinate the maintenance activities and support services to maximise maintenance efficiency and vessel availability.

The dockyard is adjacent to Stonecutters Island Sewage Treatment Plant is accessible by Ngong Shuen Road.

Former Tenants

This dockyard was the final Tamar shore station prior to the handover and used briefly by the Royal Navy. The base was closed on April 11, 1997 a few months prior to the handover and centenary of HMS Tamar's arrival to Hong Kong.

The base was used to service 3 of the Peacock class patrol ships:

 HMS Peacock
 HMS Plover
 HMS Starling

The ships remained at the decommissioned base before being sold to the Philippine Navy.

Current tenants

List of government departments with vessels serviced here:

 Hong Kong Police launches
 Hong Kong Fire Services fireboats
 Hong Kong Marine Department vessels
 Hong Kong Customs and Excise vessels

See also
 Ngong Shuen Chau Naval Base - PLA base that replaced Tamar
 People's Liberation Army Hong Kong Garrison
 Chinese People's Liberation Army Forces Hong Kong Building - former Tamar shore station
 Central Government Complex, Tamar and Tamar site - location of naval basin for HMS Tamar

References

Hong Kong government departments and agencies
Stonecutters Island